Bebek is an affluent Istanbul neighbourhood located on Bebek Bay on the European shore of the Bosphorus strait. It falls within the administrative boundaries of Beşiktaş district and is flanked by similarly affluent neighbourhoods such as Arnavutköy and Rumeli Hisarı.

'Bebek' means 'baby' in Turkish. Some believe its use as a name for this suburb comes from a shortened form of the term 'Boğaz'ın gözbebeği', which means 'pupil of the Bosphorus' or "the apple of the Bosphorus' eye" in Turkish. Others think it takes its name from the nickname for the handsome Mustafa Çelebi who was put in charge of this area after the Ottoman conquest of Constantinople in 1453. Yet others think it took its name from the Turkish expression meaning 'pretty as a baby'.

Bebek has been a popular residential district since Ottoman times and its historic architecture sometimes recalls the lost cosmopolitanism of the past. Today it is best known for a string of see-and-be-seen restaurants, cafes and shops catering to the city's more well-heeled residents. 

Infrequent Şehir Hatları ferries, mainly timed to suit commuters, call into Bebek. Otherwise it is accessible by buses running along the coast road. It is a notorious traffic bottleneck, especially at weekends.

Attractions 
The single most beautiful building in Bebek is the huge waterfront mansion that now houses the Egyptian Consulate but that was originally built in 1902 for Emina Ilhamy (Emine Hanım), mother of Abbas Hilmi, the last Khedive of Egypt, in the days when the Egyptian nobility liked to spend their summers on the Bosphorus. When he was overthrown as khedive in 1914 Abbas Hilmi donated the mansion to the Egyptian government for use as an embassy (it was downgraded to a consulate in 1923 when Atatürk moved the Turkish capital to Ankara). Designed in Art Nouveau style with sweeping mansard roofs probably by the Austrian architect, Antonio Lasciac, it was completely restored in 2010.

Down by the water, next to the Türkan Sabancı Park, the small Bebek Mosque, was designed in 1912 by the architect Kemaleddin Bey. It is sometimes called the Hümayunabad Mosque in memory of a palace of that name that once stood on the same site. 

Inland from the water Bebek is home to the Lazarist Church of Sacre Coeur, all that remains of a large complex of buildings erected in 1908.

Also in the back streets is the Kavafyan Mansion, one of the oldest wooden buildings to survive in Istanbul. Dating back to 1751, it was built for Armenian shipbuilders. Unfortunately it has been left to fall into decay.

Bosphorus University/Boğaziçi University 
Bebek is home to Boğaziçi University, a public university that is one of Turkey's premier institutions of higher education. The university occupies the buildings and grounds of the now-defunct higher education division of Robert College, an American academic institution founded in 1863 by wealthy New York merchant Christopher Robert and American missionary and educator Cyrus Hamlin. Following the merger of the formerly all-male Robert College and its sister school, the American College for Girls, all operations of the former were moved from Bebek to the wooded Arnavutköy campus of the latter, where it continues to operate.

Image gallery

See also
 Emirgan Park
 Rumelihisarı

References

External links

 Bebek Alışverişi – 
 Great Istanbul – Bebek neighborhood in Istanbul 
 Association of Bebekians also in English– Bebekliler Derneği 

Neighbourhoods of Beşiktaş
Bosphorus